Oshirasama (Japanese: おしら様, おしらさま, お白様, オシラ様, or オシラサマ, Hepburn: oshira-sama) is the tutelary deity of the home in Japanese folklore. It is believed that when oshirasama is in a person's home, one cannot eat meat and only women are allowed to touch it.

The festival day for Oshirasama is called meinichi (命日, or a death anniversary). It is held on the 16th day of the first, third, and ninth months of the Japanese lunar calendar.

Legend 

According legend Oshirasama was born from the love between a woman and horse.

In popular culture 

The deity is also a character for the film Spirited Away. In the American version of the film the character is called Radish Spirit.

References 

Japanese gods